Kitāb al–Milal wa al-Nihal (Arabic: كتاب الملل والنحل, The Book of Sects and Creeds), written by the Islamic scholar Muhammad al-Shahrastani (d. 1153 CE), is a non-polemical study of religious communities and philosophies that had existed up to his time, considered to be the first systematic study of religion. It was written around 1127-1128 and divides religions between sects, which have written doctrines, and creeds which do not.

A French translation of the book by Gimaret, Monnot and Jolivet was sponsored by UNESCO (Livre des religions et des sectes. Leuven, Peeters: vol. I, 1986, Vol. II, 1993).

See also 
 Al-Farq bayn al-Firaq
 List of Sunni books

References

Kalam
Sunni literature
Ash'ari literature
Islamic theology books
Religious studies books
12th-century Arabic books